Graovo Rocks is the group of rocks off the north coast of Robert Island in the South Shetland Islands, Antarctica.

The rocks are named after the  region in western Bulgaria.

Location
British mapping in 1968 and Bulgarian in 2009.

See also 
 Composite Antarctic Gazetteer
 List of Antarctic and sub-Antarctic islands
 List of Antarctic islands south of 60° S
 SCAR
 Territorial claims in Antarctica

Maps
 L.L. Ivanov. Antarctica: Livingston Island and Greenwich, Robert, Snow and Smith Islands. Scale 1:120000 topographic map.  Troyan: Manfred Wörner Foundation, 2009.

Notes

References
 Bulgarian Antarctic Gazetteer. Antarctic Place-names Commission. (details in Bulgarian, basic data in English)
 SCAR Composite Gazetteer of Antarctica.

External links
 Graovo Rocks. Copernix satellite image

Rock formations of Robert Island
Bulgaria and the Antarctic